Michael B. Gillislee Jr. (born November 1, 1990) is a former American football running back. He played college football for the University of Florida. He was drafted by the Miami Dolphins in the fifth round of the 2013 NFL Draft.

Early years
Gillislee attended DeLand High School in DeLand, Florida. He recorded 900 rushing yards as a sophomore and over 1,200 yards as a junior. As a senior, he rushed for 1,149 yards on 227 carries for a 5.1-yard average. He was considered a four-star recruit by Rivals.com and was rated as the seventh-best all-purpose running back prospect in the nation.

College career
Gillislee accepted an athletic scholarship to attend the University of Florida, where he played under coaches Urban Meyer and Will Muschamp's Florida Gators football teams from 2009 to 2012. As a true freshman in 2009, Gillislee played in 13 games, rushing for 267 yards on 31 carries with two touchdowns. As a sophomore in 2010, he played in 10 games and had 325 rushing yards on 58 carries with seven touchdowns. As a junior in 2011, he rushed for 328 yards on 56 carries with two touchdowns. As a senior in 2012, Gillislee finished the regular season with 1,104 yards on 235 carries and 10 touchdowns.  He became the first Florida Gator to go over 1,000 rushing yards since 2004.

Collegiate statistics

Professional career

Miami Dolphins
The Miami Dolphins drafted Gillislee in the fifth round, 164th pick overall, of the 2013 NFL Draft. He signed a four-year, $2.322 million contract with the Dolphins on May 19, 2013. On December 1, 2013, he made his NFL debut with six rushes for 21 yards against the New York Jets. He only appeared in two other games for the remainder of his rookie season.

After not contributing in the 2014 regular season and being on injured reserve, on September 5, 2015, Gillislee was released by the Dolphins.

Arizona Cardinals
On September 22, 2015, Gillislee was signed to the Arizona Cardinals' practice squad. He was released from the Cardinals' practice squad on October 22.

Buffalo Bills

2015 season

On November 4, 2015, the Buffalo Bills signed Gillislee to the practice squad. On December 5, 2015, Gillislee was promoted to the 53 man roster. During his first game as a member of the Bills in Week 13's matchup against the Houston Texans, Gillislee broke away for a 30-yard gain, his personal longest rush as an NFL player at the time. On December 13, 2015, Gillislee scored his first career touchdown in a game against the Philadelphia Eagles. The following week, he scored his second career touchdown against the Washington Redskins. Gillislee became the first Bills running back since 1997 to produce touchdown runs of at least 50 yards in back-to-back weeks, a 60-yarder in Week 15 and a 50-yarder in Week 16. Overall, he finished his first season with the Bills with 267 rushing yards and three rushing touchdowns.

2016 season
On January 4, 2016, the Bills signed Gillislee to a contract extension. After Karlos Williams was released by the Bills after showing up out of shape, he stepped in and took the role of Bills' backup running back. Gillislee rushed for 577 yards on 101 carries. He posted 9 receptions and 50 yards receiving. Gillislee's 5.7 yards per carry led all NFL running backs during the 2016 season.

When Gillislee was set to be a restricted free agent, the Bills placed an original round (fifth round) tender on Gillislee. On April 18, 2017, the New England Patriots extended a two-year, $6.4 million offer sheet to Gillislee, giving the Bills five days to match.

New England Patriots
On April 24, 2017, was signed by the New England Patriots. He was offered contracts by both the Bills and the Patriots, but the Bills declined to match the offer made by the Patriots. Gillislee signed for the Patriots on a two-year, $6.4 million deal. In order to sign him, the Patriots had to give up a 2017 fifth round draft pick that was used to select Matt Milano.

In the season opener against the Kansas City Chiefs on September 7, Gillislee had 15 rushes for 45 yards and a career-high three rushing touchdowns in his Patriots debut. However, he was stopped by the Chiefs defense on two fourth down plays in the 42–27 loss. In the game, Gillislee scored the first points of the 2017 NFL season with his first rushing touchdown in the first quarter. On September 17, in Week 2 against the New Orleans Saints, he followed up his Week 1 performance with 18 carries for 69 yards and a touchdown to bring his season total to four. After a promising start to the season, Gillislee’s role was limited and was inactive for seven games. He finished his first season in New England with 104 carries for 383 yards and 5 touchdowns and also caught a pass for 15 yards. Gillislee was inactive for the playoffs. Without Gillislee, the Patriots reached Super Bowl LII where they lost by a score of 41-33 to the Philadelphia Eagles.

On September 1, 2018, Gillislee was released by the Patriots after being passed on the depth chart by veteran Jeremy Hill.

New Orleans Saints
The New Orleans Saints signed Gillislee to a one-year contract on September 2. He was released on October 6, 2018, after Mark Ingram II returned from suspension. He finished the 2018 season with 16 carries for 43 yards.

He reportedly worked out for the Detroit Lions in February 2019.

NFL career statistics

Personal life
Gillislee is a cousin of NFL wide receiver Louis Murphy.

References

External links

 Florida Gators bio

1990 births
Living people
People from DeLand, Florida
American football running backs
Players of American football from Florida
Sportspeople from Volusia County, Florida
Florida Gators football players
Miami Dolphins players
Arizona Cardinals players
Buffalo Bills players
New England Patriots players
New Orleans Saints players